Wedig is a surname. Notable people with the surname include:

Gottfried Wedig (1583–1641), 17th-century German painter
Joseph Wedig (1826–???), Member of the Wisconsin State Assembly
Kasimir Wedig von Bonin (1691–1752), Prussian lieutenant general
William Wedig (born 1983), American filmmaker